Vitamin D is the debut studio album by Canadian dubstep producer and artist Datsik, released on April 10, 2012. The album was co-produced by various electronic music producers such as fellow Canadian dubstep producer Downlink, Israeli psytrance and electronica production duo Infected Mushroom and American DJ Z-Trip. The first official single from the album is "Fully Blown" (featuring Snak the Ripper), which was released on January 31. The second single, "Evilution", which was co-produced by Infected Mushroom and features vocals from Jonathan Davis of the nu metal band Korn, was released on March 13.

"Light the Fuse" was released as a single (with remixes by Terravita and Sub Antix) over a year after the album's release.

Background 
This is Datsik's first studio album. Datsik mainly created the album's tracks; the album also includes tracks that were co-produced by Downlink, Infected Mushroom and Z-Trip and co-written by Snak the Ripper, Jonathan Davis and Messinian.

Track listing 

 (co.) designates co-producer

Charts

References 

2012 debut albums
Datsik (musician) albums
Dim Mak Records albums
Last Gang Records albums
Albums produced by Datsik (musician)
Albums produced by Infected Mushroom
Albums produced by Jonathan Davis
Albums produced by Z-Trip